Luciano Zampatti (12 May 1903 – 1 December 1957) was an Italian ski jumper. He competed in the individual event at the 1928 Winter Olympics. He also finished second in the 1934 Italian ski jumping championships.

References

External links
 

1903 births
1957 deaths
Italian male ski jumpers
Olympic ski jumpers of Italy
Ski jumpers at the 1928 Winter Olympics